The 1979 Navarrese foral election was held on Tuesday, 3 April 1979, to elect the Foral Parliament of Navarre. All 70 seats in the Parliament were up for election. The election was held simultaneously with local elections all throughout Spain.

Overview

Electoral system
Voting for the Foral Parliament was on the basis of universal suffrage, which comprised all nationals over 18 years of age, registered in Navarre and in full enjoyment of their civil and political rights. The 70 members of the Foral Parliament of Navarre were elected using the D'Hondt method and a closed list proportional representation, with an electoral threshold of five percent of valid votes—which includes blank ballots—being applied in each constituency. Seats were allocated to constituencies, corresponding to the historical merindades of Estella, Pamplona—which was sub-divided into two districts, one comprising the capital and another one for the remaining territory—, Sangüesa, Tafalla–Olite and Tudela, with each being allocated an initial minimum of five seats and the remaining 40 allocated among the constituencies in proportion to their populations (provided that no district was allocated more than 1/3 of the forty seats up for distribution).

The use of the D'Hondt method might result in a higher effective threshold, depending on the district magnitude.

The electoral law allowed for parties and federations registered in the interior ministry, coalitions and groupings of electors to present lists of candidates. Parties and federations intending to form a coalition ahead of an election were required to inform the relevant Electoral Commission within fifteen days of the election call, whereas groupings of electors needed to secure the signature of at least one-thousandth of the electorate in the constituencies for which they sought election—with a compulsory minimum of 500 signatures—disallowing electors from signing for more than one list of candidates.

Election date
The foral election was fixed to be held concurrently with the nationwide 1979 local elections.

Results

Overall

Distribution by constituency

Estella

Pamplona (capital)

Pamplona (rest)

Sangüesa

Tafalla–Olite

Tudela

References

1979 in Navarre
Navarre
Regional elections in Navarre
April 1979 events in Europe